Louis Freeman may refer to:

 Scottie Wilson (Louis Freeman, 1888–1972), Scottish outsider artist
 Louis Freeman (pilot) (born 1952), American commercial airline pilot

See also
 Louis Friedman (disambiguation)